WONE may refer to:

 WONE (AM), an AM radio station located in Dayton, Ohio
 WONE-FM, an FM radio station located in Akron, Ohio